LSW IF is a Swedish football club located in Motala in Östergötland County.

Background
The full name of the club is Lemunda Starka Wiljor Idrottsförening but the organisation is now known in its abbreviated form as LSW IF.   The club runs men's and ladies sides and is supported by an active youth section.

Since their foundation LSW IF has participated mainly in the middle and lower divisions of the Swedish football league system.  The club currently plays in Division 3 Nordöstra Götaland which is the fifth tier of Swedish football. They play their home matches at the Norra IP in Motala.

LSW IF are affiliated to Östergötlands Fotbollförbund.

The young players are playing at mossen

Recent history
In recent seasons LSW IF have competed in the following divisions:

2011 – Division III, Nordöstra Götaland
2010 – Division III, Nordöstra Götaland
2009 – Division III, Nordöstra Götaland
2008 – Division III, Nordöstra Götaland
2007 – Division IV, Östergötland Västra
2006 – Division IV, Östergötland Västra
2005 – Division IV, Östergötland Västra
2004 – Division III, Nordöstra Götaland
2003 – Division III, Nordöstra Götaland
2002 – Division III, Nordöstra Götaland
2001 – Division III, Nordöstra Götaland
2000 – Division III, Nordöstra Götaland
1999 – Division III, Nordöstra Götaland

Attendances

In recent seasons LSW IF have had the following average attendances:

Footnotes

External links
 LSW IF – Official website

Football clubs in Östergötland County